WWE (formerly World Wrestling Federation and World Wrestling Entertainment), an American professional wrestling promotion based in Stamford, Connecticut in the United States owned by the McMahon family, has been promoting events in the United Kingdom (UK) since 1989. From 1989 to 2001 WWE was promoted under concert promoter Harvey Goldsmith and his brother Martin Goldsmith for UK and European shows.

International broadcasts from the UK

Pay-per-views
Over the years, World Wrestling Federation/Entertainment has run several broadcast events based in the UK. In 1989, the WWF held their First WWF UK event, which aired exclusively in the UK. From 1991 to 1993 similar UK exclusive broadcasts known as UK Rampage. In 1991 the WWF filmed the supercard event Battle Royal at the Albert Hall, in London.

SummerSlam 1992 was the first WWE pay-per-view broadcast from the UK on August 29 (aired August 31). In 1997 they returned to the UK with WWF One Night Only. In 1998 the WWF returned to the UK for WWF Mayhem in Manchester and WWF Capital Carnage, which aired exclusively in the UK. The following year they returned with No Mercy. From 1999 to 2002 they ran a fall pay-per-view from the UK known as WWE Rebellion. In addition from 2000 to 2003 they ran a spring pay-per-view from the UK known as WWE Insurrextion.

Mayhem in Manchester

Mayhem in Manchester was a professional wrestling event exclusively for United Kingdom (UK), produced by the World Wrestling Federation (WWF) that took place on 4 April 1998 at the Nynex Arena in Manchester, England. The event was released later in an edited form on VHS in North America and in the UK. With the exception of the "Old School" editions of WWE Raw on November 15, 2010, March 4, 2013, and January 6, 2014, along with the Raw 25 Years on January 25, 2018, and the Throwback SmackDown edition on May 7, 2021, this was the last ever WWF event to feature the WWF New Generation logo with the posts, ring skirt, floor mats and steps as light blue with the ropes colored red, white and blue.

Production

Background
The event was originally scheduled to be a UK exclusive pay-per-view, as a follow up to the success of One Night Only. As the event drew closer, the WWF cancelled plans to broadcast the event, due to a profit sharing disagreement with the venue. In addition Davey Boy Smith and Shawn Michaels, who the WWF has planned to center the event around, were no longer with the company by the time of the event. The event would later be released on video rather than broadcasting live.

Storylines
The card consisted of eight matches, that resulted from scripted storylines and had results predetermined by the WWF.

The main event heading into the event was between Stone Cold Steve Austin and Triple H for the WWF Championship. After Austin defeated Shawn Michaels at WrestleMania to win the WWF Championship, Michaels retired from professional wrestling due to back injury (He returned to wrestling in 2002), and then Austin continued his feud with D-Generation X members. It was announced that Austin would face Triple H for the WWF Championship at Mayhem in Manchester.

Another main event heading into the event was between The Undertaker and Kane. After The Undertaker defeated his brother Kane at WrestleMania XIV, it was announced that the two would face each other again at Mayhem in Manchester.

Event

Preliminary matches
During the opening match of the event Jeff Jarrett defeated Brakkus via submission, when Brakkus tapped out to the figure-4 leglock.

The second match saw The Godwinns (Henry and Phineas) defeat The Disciples of Apocalypse (Skull and 8-Ball) in a strap match. Henry picked up the pinfall victory after hitting the Slop Drop on Skull.

Prior to the next match, Marc Mero sent Sable to the back, due to a series of issues leading up to the event. Mero however lost the match following Bradshaw hitting him with the lariat.

The following match saw Ken Shamrock and Owen Hart defeated The Nation of Domination (The Rock and D'Lo Brown), after brown tapped out to Shamrock's ankle lock.

The next match was between Cactus Jack and The Artist Formerly Known As Goldust. During the match, as Jack when to suplex Goldust, Luna Vachon tripped Jack. Following this, Goldust covered Jack and picked up the pinfall victory. Following the match, Sable came out to attack Vachon. Continuing with the issues from earlier in the night, Mero followed Sable out and pulled her off of Vachon. As Goldust and Vachon used this opportunity to escape, Sable turned around and attacked Mero, then left with Mero still on the ground in the ring.

The following match saw WWF Tag Team Champions, The New Age Outlaws (Road Dogg and Billy Gunn), defend their titles against LOD 2000 (Road Warrior Animal and Hawk). As LOD attempted to hit the Doomsday Device on Dogg, Chyna entered the ring and hit Animal with a low blow. The referee awarded the victory to LOD via disqualification, allowing The New Age Outlaws to retain the titles.

Main event matches
In the first main event, Stone Cold Steve Austin and Triple H held the WWF Championship and WWF European Championship respectively, however only Austin's title was on the line during the match. At the end of the match, Chyna attempted to interfere, however Austin hit her with the Stunner, followed by hitting Triple H with a Stunner as well, to pick up the pinfall victory.
In some areas this turned out to be the final match.

The main event of the evening saw The Undertaker defeat Kane via pinfall, following a Tombstone.

Results

Weekly television shows
Insurrextion in 2003 at the Telewest Arena in Newcastle, England marked the last of WWE's UK exclusive pay-per-views. However, WWE started to broadcast Raw and SmackDown! from the UK in 2004. Due to the time change, all broadcasts were recorded and aired on tape delay. The first Raw broadcast from the United Kingdom was October 11, 2004, with a SmackDown! recording the following day. Beginning in 2005 WWE would record twice per year in the United Kingdom, once in the spring and once in the fall. In November 2008, WWE recorded two episodes of SmackDown.  all recordings have occurred in England, with the exception of November 2016 which took place at the SSE Hydro in Glasgow, Scotland.

From 2006 to 2009, WWE's recording schedule in the United Kingdom included episodes of ECW.

2004–2010

2011–present

NXT/NXT UK
On December 16, 2015, the WWE held their first NXT event in the UK, NXT TakeOver: London. In January 2017, they returned for the first United Kingdom Championship Tournament, with the second tournament in June 2018. In May 2017 they also hosted a United Kingdom Championship Special from the UK.

In a press conference at The O2 Arena on December 15, 2016, Triple H revealed that there would be a 16-man tournament to crown the inaugural WWE United Kingdom Champion. The tournament was held over a two-day period, January 14 and 15, 2017, and aired exclusively on the WWE Network. Tyler Bate won the inaugural tournament to become the first WWE United Kingdom Champion. In August 2018 Rhea Ripley became the first NXT UK Women's Champion. In January 2019, James Drake and Zack Gibson became the inaugural NXT UK Tag Team Champions.

When the championship was unveiled in December 2016, it was announced to be the top championship of a new WWE Network show, produced in the United Kingdom. However, it was not until mid-2018 when WWE formally established NXT UK as the brand for their United Kingdom division. The brand's show, also titled NXT UK, had its first tapings in August, which began airing on October 17. On January 12, 2019, the first live special episode of NXT UK aired, called NXT UK TakeOver: Blackpool.

Broadcast

WWE has been broadcast in the United Kingdom on the Sky series of television channels since the 1980s, with a small selection of shows (including Sunday Night Heat and four PPVs a year) briefly being broadcast on Channel 4 in 2000 and 2001. In 2014, WWE signed a 5-year renewal deal with Sky, to carry programs through the end of 2019, which included adding WWE Main Event to the line up of shows carried. In June 2019 BT Sport announced that from January 2020 they would be the home of WWE in the UK. Hoever, BT Sport was then acquired in April 2022 by Warner Bros. Discovery, the parent company of rival All Elite Wrestling broadcasters TNT and TBS in the United States.

The WWE Network launched in December 2014 in the United Kingdom.

BT Sport

Channel 5
WWE is also shown on tape delay on Channel 5 since February 2020. The weekly Monday Night Raw and Friday Night Smackdown are shown every Sunday at 10:00am and 11:00am. The shows are 1 hour highlights with advertisements. On My5, every episode of Total Divas and Miz and Mrs are available to watch with no extra cost.

WWE Performance Center
The second WWE Performance Center branch opened on 11 January 2019 in Enfield, London.

References

 
WWE international